The Elks Club Building is the second and former clubhouse of the Manila Elks Lodge #761—Manila Lodge 761, better known as the Manila Elks Club, in Manila, the Philippines. It was designed by William E. Parsons.

The Manila Elks Lodge #761 is a unique branch club of the Benevolent and Protective Order of Elks—BPOE, an American fraternal order. It is one of only two Elks Club established outside of current United States territory, the other being in Panama near the former American territory of the Panama Canal Zone,

History

The Manila Elks Club was founded after the Spanish–American War ended in 1898 which resulted in the transfer of the Spanish Philippines to the United States control.  In 1901, a group of Americans residing in Manila for the "unbridled entrepreneurial possibilities,"and "yearning for camaraderie and solidarity," petitioned the national Elks organization to allow the founding of an Elks Club on American soil in the Philippines. . The Grand Exalted Ruler of the Grand Lodge in the United States approved the petition in 1905.

The first clubhouse, formerly Clubhouse of the Order of the Elks, was established along Calle Victoria in Intramuros, Manila. In 1904, it moved to Calle San Luis opposite the Old Luneta.

Finally in 1910, it built its permanent home at the site that was used to be occupied by the Manila Overseas Press Club and now occupied by the Museo Pambata ng Maynila. Following the proposed Manila Plan of Daniel Burnham, the Elks Club was housed in a three-story building with features similar to the Manila Army and Navy Club co-located on the same piece of property. One building housed a civilian club and the other a military club.  The original Manila Elks Club building, designed in the Mission Revival style modeled on the architecture of the California missions, opened in 1910 on the land purchased in the Luneta Park extension, in the Ermita District of Manila.

After the inauguration of the Commonwealth of the Philippines, ending the U.S. territorial Insular Government of the Philippine Islands, this clubhouse housed the United States High Commissioner to the Philippines and his staff from 1935 to 1940.

In 1942, during the World War II Japanese occupation of the Philippines, Japanese forces marched directly to the Elks Club and the adjacent Army and Navy Club, taking almost 100 residents from both clubs to be imprisoned in the Santo Tomas Internment Camp.

This first Elks Club building was left in ruins by the war's end. It was later destroyed during the war, after which a two-story edifice was built by the Cojuangco family in February 1949.

In February 1949, the Elks Lodge #761 opened the newly rebuilt Manila Elks Club building on the site of the first, though on the renamed Dewey Boulevard. The Elks occupied this building until the 1960s.  The building along Roxas Boulevard was later acquired by the Philippine government.

Elks Lodge #761 present-day
In the 1960s, because of issues of foreign ownership of the property, the Elks Lodge #761 (the Manila Elks Club) moved out of its second clubhouse to new facility in the Flag Village area of Makati, across from where the Rockwell Center is today.

In 1977, the Elks Lodge #761 moved again, acquiring 1000 square meters of space on the 7th floor of the Corinthian Plaza building in central Makati, Metro Manila, where they are still located.   It still is "the American Club in the Philippines".

Museo Pambata

The 1949 second Manila Elks Club building and its grounds, on renamed Roxas Boulevard, now houses the Museo Pambata or the children's museum.  The museum was founded by Dr. Estefania Aldaba-Lim in 1994, who was a Philippine presidential cabinet member, active in UNICEF (the United Nations Children's Fund), and founded the Institute of Human Relations at Philippine Women's University.

See also
History of the Philippines (1898–1946)

References

External links

  of the Manila Elks Club

Elks buildings
Buildings and structures in Ermita
Organizations based in Metro Manila
Museums in Metro Manila
History of Manila
Cultural Properties of the Philippines in Metro Manila
Buildings and structures completed in 1905
Mission Revival architecture
Children's museums
National Historical Landmarks of the Philippines
Child-related organizations in the Philippines
1905 establishments in the Philippines
20th-century architecture in the Philippines